Edwin David Sanborn (May 14, 1808 – December 29, 1885) was a United States educator.

Biography
Edwin David Sanborn was born in Gilmanton, New Hampshire on May 14, 1808. He graduated from Dartmouth College in 1832, taught for a year at Gilmanton, studied law, and afterward divinity at Andover Theological Seminary, and became a tutor and (later in the same year) professor of Latin at Dartmouth in 1835. In 1859 he became professor of classical literature at Washington University in St. Louis and principal at the Mary Institute and St. Louis Country Day School but in 1865 he returned to Dartmouth as professor of oratory and belles-lettres. In 1880 he assumed the new chair of Anglo-Saxon and the English language and literature. He received the degree of LL.D. from the University of Vermont in 1859. He was a leader in public affairs in his town and state, and was several times elected to the legislature.

He died in New York on December 29, 1885.

Writings
Besides contributions to newspapers and magazines, he published lectures on education, a Eulogy on Daniel Webster (Hanover, 1853), and a History of New Hampshire, from Its First Discovery to the Year 1830 (Manchester, 1875).

Family
He married, on December 11, 1837, Mary Ann, a niece of Daniel Webster. Their daughter Kate Sanborn became a noted author, lecturer and educator.

Notes

References

External links
 

1808 births
1885 deaths
People from Gilmanton, New Hampshire
Dartmouth College alumni
Dartmouth College faculty
Members of the New Hampshire General Court
19th-century American politicians
Washington University in St. Louis faculty
University of Vermont alumni
Andover Theological Seminary alumni